The Westmount Golf and Country Club is a private sports and country club located in Kitchener, Ontario, Canada. Its grounds span the municipal boundary with Waterloo. The club features golf, curling and tennis facilities.

The club was founded in 1929 by members of the Grand River Golf Club. The club was officially opened in 1931, and its golf course architect was Stanley Thompson.  The curling facility was opened in 1963 and a tennis facility in 1977.

Golf
Major golf tournaments held at the Westmount have included the Canadian Open Golf Championship in 1957, the Canadian Ladies Open and Closed Championship in 1965, the Canadian Amateur Golf Championship in 1969, the Labatt's International Golf Classic for the C.P.G.A. in 1981, and the 1990 du Maurier Classic.

Curling

The Westmount Club has been home to many provincial champions:

1995 Master (60+) Women: Betty MacMillan, Leile Walter, Marjorie McCauley, Marlene Olender
2008 Bantam (U16) Boys:  Mike Flemming, Brett Dekoning, Dave Mathers, Ian Romansky
2010 Pepsi Ontario Junior Curling Championships (Men's):  Jake Walker, Craig Van Ymeren, Geoff Chambers, Matthew Mapletoft (National champions)
2010 Bantam (U16) Girls: Kendall Haymes, Margot Flemming, Cassie Savage, Megan Arnold
2010 Tim Hortons Colts (Men's): Mark Kean, Andrew Flemming, Edward Cyr, Terry Arnold
2014 Travelers Curling Club Championship (Women's):  Kerry Lackie, Lisa McLean, Halyna Tepylo, Cynthia Roth (National champions)
2017 & 2018 Ontario U21 Men's Curling Champions:  Matthew Hall, Jeffery Wanless, Joseph Hart, David Hart

The Club hosted the 2007 Canadian Mixed Curling Championship.

References
Westmount Golf and Country Club - The Club
University of Waterloo Library - Special Collections & Archives
Ontario Curling Association - Westmount Golf & Country Club

Sports organizations established in 1929
Curling clubs in Canada
Golf clubs and courses in Ontario
Sport in Kitchener, Ontario
Sports venues in Kitchener, Ontario
Curling in Ontario
1929 establishments in Ontario